Joseph Masurka (born September 29) better known as Joe Maz, is a producer & DJ. Joe Maz has produced official remixes for Adele, Coldplay & Beyoncé, Kanye West, Major Lazer & Dua Lipa and Flo Rida. In 2022, Maz's remix of Masked Wolf - Astronaut in the Ocean was voted #1 of the year at the Electronic Dance Music Awards, he was also nominated for Remixer of the Year. In 2017, he was voted Remixer of the Year at Summer Sessions in Atlantic City, with the legendary Nile Rodgers presenting the award. In 2018, he was again nominated for Remixer of the Year at Summer Session In 2019, Joe won Remix of the Year in the rap category at the Remix Awards in Miami

History 
Prior to launching his solo career, Joe was also involved in two other collaborative projects, DiscoTech and Señor Stereo, both alongside DJ's Danny Daze and Gigamesh.

In 2008, he joined DJ AM's agency Deckstar.

Musical career 
In 2016, his single "No Good" reached #14 on the Billboard Dance Chart and he joined the Billboard panel as a reporting member.

Joe's music has been played in DJ sets of Jack Ü, Diplo, Afrojack, and Hardwell. His remix of Major Lazer's "Cold Water" received over 1.5 million plays on Soundcloud.

Joe Maz has several #1 ranked remixes in the United States including "Bad Guy" by Billie Eilish, "Sweet But Psycho" by Ava Max, "Unforttable" by French Montana, "Starboy" by The Weeknd ft. Daft Punk, "Cold Water" by Major Lazer ft. Justin Bieber, and "Roses" by The Chainsmokers.

Discography

Singles

Remixes

References

American DJs
Living people
1981 births
Record producers from Florida